Grinzane Cavour is a comune (municipality) in the Province of Cuneo in the Italian region Piedmont, located about  southeast of Turin and about  northeast of Cuneo.

Grinzane Cavour borders the municipalities of Alba and Diano d'Alba.

Originally simply known as Grinzane, it switched to the current name in homage to Camillo Benso, Count Cavour, who was mayor of the city for 17 years.

The main attraction is the massive medieval castle. Until 2009, Grinzane Cavour was also the seat of the eponymous literary award.

Twin towns
 Canosa di Puglia, Italy

References

External links 

 Official website

Cities and towns in Piedmont
Castles in Italy